the little Death (sometimes listed as The Little Death) is a 2006 American micro-budget mystery-thriller directed by Morgan Nichols. It stars Chris Butler, Laura Lee Bahr, Oded Gross, G. Maximilian Zarou, and tells the story of a man who attempts to find a mysterious box hidden by his father in an L.A. apartment. Atlanta Film Festival director Jake Jacobson called the little Death  "a beautiful mystery-thriller done on a shoestring."

Synopsis
Seventeen years ago, Sam (Chris Butler)'s father hid a mysterious box in the walls of apartment 1412, and now Sam has come to Los Angeles to claim it. But the rooms have been renumbered and Sam's hunt soon leads him into the world of a mysterious young woman in what is ultimately "a sinister tale of a very unmerry Christmas."

Cast
 Laura Lee Bahr as Audrey / Angel
 Chris Butler as Sam
 G. Maximilian Zarou as Jr. Detective Hal Gerard
 Oded Gross as Buddy / Stacey

Awards, honors, and festivals
 The Little Death premiered at the closing ceremony of the Atlanta Film Festival; festival director Jake Jacobson praised the film with a comparison to Stephen Soderbergh's Sex, Lies, and Videotape and Chris Butler won the festival's best actor honors.
 At VISIONFEST in New York City, writer/star Laura Lee Bahr won the Best Writing and Best Actress awards for the little Death.  
 Special Jury Prize for Cinematography at the Lake Forest Film Festival.
 The film also showed at the Australian International Film Festival and the Temecula Valley International Film Festival

Reception
Critic Curt Holman wrote "Director Morgan Nichols displays an eerie, deadpan style reminiscent of David Lynch or Barton Fink-era Coen Brothers."

References

External links
 
 The original Trailer for the little Death
 official site for production company Movie Farm
 Atlanta Film Festival
 Australian International Film Festival
 Temecula Valley International Film & Music Festival
 VISIONFEST

2006 films
American mystery thriller films
2000s mystery thriller films
2000s English-language films
2000s American films